Michel Desjoyeaux (born 16 July 1965 in Concarneau) is a French sailor, known for competing successfully in several long-distance single-handed races.  He won the Vendée Globe race in 2000-01 and 2008–09, making him the only person to win that race more than once. In 2014-15, he was watch captain, on leg 1 on Mapfre in the Volvo Ocean Race.

Race Results Highlights

See also
 Mini Transat 6.50
 Scow

References

External links
 
 
 Official Mer agitée
 

1965 births
Living people
People from Concarneau
French male sailors (sport)
Volvo Ocean Race sailors
Sportspeople from Finistère
French Vendee Globe sailors
2000 Vendee Globe sailors
2008 Vendee Globe sailors
Vendée Globe finishers
Single-handed circumnavigating sailors